The Era Fascista ("Fascist Era") was a calendar era (year numbering) used in Fascist Italy. The March on Rome, or more precisely the accession of Mussolini as prime minister on 29 October 1922, is day 1 of Anno I of the Era Fascista. The calendar was introduced in 1926 and became official in Anno V (1927). Each year of the Era Fascista was an Anno Fascista, abbreviated A.F.

The Era Fascista calendar was inspired by the French Republican calendar. 

Era Fascista dates often consisted of the Gregorian date followed by the corresponding Era Fascista year in Roman numerals, as part of Fascist propaganda's appropriation of ancient Roman iconography. The Era Fascista year was sometimes written as "Anno XIX", "A. XIX", or marked "E.F." The calendar was intended to replace the "bourgeois" Gregorian calendar in Italian public life to the extent that, in 1939, newspapers were forbidden to write about New Year's Day.

The tenth anniversary of the March on Rome, Anno X, was called the Decennale (evoking the ancient Roman Decennalia). The propaganda centerpiece of Anno X was the Exhibition of the Fascist Revolution.

The calendar was abandoned in most of Italy with the fall of the Fascist regime in 1943 (Anno XXI), but continued to be used in the rump Republic of Salò until the death of Mussolini in April 1945 (Anno XXIII).

Many monuments in Italy still bear Era Fascista dates.

References

Calendar eras
Italian Fascism
1926 establishments in Italy
1943 disestablishments in Italy
1926 introductions